Vegavis is a genus of extinct bird that lived during the Late Cretaceous (Maastrichtian stage) of Antarctica, some 68 to 66 mya. Among modern birds, most studies show that Vegavis is most closely related to ducks and geese (Anatidae), but it is not considered to be a direct ancestor of them,  although other studies question these results.

Taxonomy 

The holotype specimen of Vegavis is held by the Museo de La Plata, Argentina. The specimen, cataloged as MLP 93-I-3-1, was found in the López de Bertodano Formation at Cape Lamb on Vega Island, Antarctica, in 1993, but was only described as a new species in 2005 because it consists of the very delicate remains of one bird embedded in a concretion, which had to be meticulously prepared for study. CT scans were utilized to gain a clearer picture of the bone structure without running danger of damaging or destroying the fossil.

The genus name, Vegavis, is a combination of the name of Vega Island and "avis", the Latin word for bird. The species name, "iaai", is after the acronym for Instituto Antartico Argentino (IAA), the Argentine scientific expedition to Antarctica.

A second specimen, MACN-PV 19.748, was found beside the holotype specimen. It was preserved in three dimensions; CT scans were again utilized to visualize the intact syrinx of this specimen. The syrinx has an asymmetrical third segment, suggesting that Vegavis had two sources of sound in the neck and along with large soft-tissue resonating structures. This indicates that it was likely capable of honks as in ducks, geese, and other basal neognaths. 
In 2017 a phylogenetic study Agnolín and colleagues have found Vegavis to be stem-anseriforms along with Polarornis, Neogaeornis and Australornis in the family Vegaviidae.

Evolution 
 
The discovery of the type species, Vegavis iaai, demonstrates that the major groups of bird alive today had already diversified in the Cretaceous. This supports the longstanding phylogenetic inferences of paleornithologists. It has been hailed as the first definitive physical proof that representatives of some of the groups of modern birds lived in the Mesozoic.

Paleobiology
Vegavis was a bird with high metabolism, which allowed it to live at high latitudes in Antarctica. It also shows
a degree of osteosclerosis, a condition shared with Polarornis. This different degrees of osteosclerosis could be related to variations in diving behaviour.

See also 
 Asteriornis

References

External links 
 'Dinosaurs Mingled with Cousins of Ducks and Chickens', from Live Science
 ‘These Are the Dinosaurs That Didn't Die’, from National Geographic

Prehistoric bird genera
Cretaceous birds of Antarctica
Fossils of Antarctica
Fossil taxa described in 2005